Isamnayevo (İśänbay) is a rural locality (a selo) and the administrative centre of Isanbayevsky Selsoviet, Ilishevsky District, Bashkortostan, Russia. The population was 523 as of 2010. There are 5 streets.

Geography 
Isanbayevo is located 18 km north of Verkhneyarkeyevo (the district's administrative centre) by road. Krasny Oktyabr is the nearest rural locality.

References 

Rural localities in Ilishevsky District